The Samoa Observer is the largest newspaper group in Samoa published in both English and Samoan. The Samoa Observer is published Monday to Friday, the Weekend Observer on Saturdays and the Sunday Samoan on Sundays with all editions available online. Coverage includes local and international news, editorial opinion, sports and investigative journalism. The Samoa Observer was founded in 1978 by Editor in Chief, Savea Sano Malifa, a poet and leading Pacific journalist who was awarded the prestigious Commonwealth Astor Award for press freedom in 1998.

The independent paper has received other awards for investigative journalism and press freedom. It has faced lawsuits from government officials and business leaders following the publication of stories about corruption and abuse of public office in Samoa. The main offices are located in Apia, the country's capital. 

In 1994, the paper's offices were destroyed in a fire after official corruption stories.

References

External links 
 
 

Mass media in Samoa
English-language newspapers published in Oceania
Newspapers published in Samoa
1979 establishments in Samoa